Heather Humphreys (born 14 May 1963) is an Irish Fine Gael politician who has served as Minister for Rural and Community Development and Minister for Social Protection since June 2020. She also briefly served as Minister for Justice in November and December 2022 to facilitate the maternity leave of Helen McEntee, which she had previously done from April to November 2021. She has been a Teachta Dála (TD) for the Cavan–Monaghan constituency since 2011.

She previously served as Minister for Business, Enterprise and Innovation from 2017 to 2020, Minister for Culture, Heritage and the Gaeltacht from June 2017 to November 2017, Minister for Arts, Heritage, Regional, Rural and Gaeltacht Affairs from 2016 to 2017 and Minister for Arts, Heritage and the Gaeltacht from 2014 to 2016.

Early life
Humphreys was born in the village of Drum, County Monaghan, in 1963. She was raised as a Presbyterian; her father is a member of the Orange Order, while her grandfather, Robert James Stewart, signed the Ulster Covenant opposing Home Rule in 1912. Humphreys was educated at St. Aidan's Comprehensive School in Cootehill. She then attended University College Galway. For a number of years she worked as an official with Ulster Bank and the Credit Union. She was later appointed manager of Cootehill Credit Union.

Early political career
Following the abolition of the dual mandate in 2003, Humphreys was co-opted onto Monaghan County Council in succession to Seymour Crawford. She was elected in her own right at the 2004 local elections and once again following the 2009 local elections. She was elected as Mayor of Monaghan County in 2009. While a member of the council, she served as Chair of the council's Strategic Policy Committee on Planning and Economic Development.

Humphreys was elected as a Fine Gael TD for Cavan–Monaghan at the 2011 general election. She is the only Presbyterian member of the Oireachtas.

Ministerial career
After an initial period on the backbenches, Humphreys was appointed Minister for Arts, Heritage and the Gaeltacht, following a cabinet reshuffle in July 2014. After just a few months in the position she became embroiled in controversy over her appointment of John McNulty to the board of the Irish Museum of Modern Art (IMMA) on 12 September 2014 just before his nomination for a Seanad by-election to the Cultural and Educational Panel. Fianna Fáil leader Micheál Martin said at the "very basic level, she should say what officials in Fine Gael asked her to appoint Mr McNulty to the board of Imma". Although Humphreys said John Nulty was selected "on merit", she later admitted she regretted the decision.

In the preparations of the 2016 Easter Rising centenary celebrations, she said: 

In March 2016, Humphreys approved a decision to demolish the buildings 13-19 on Moore Street as she deemed them to not be of "historical importance". The buildings were where the first bullets of the 1916 Easter rising were fired.

Following the formation of a Fine Gael minority government in May 2016, Humphreys was appointed to the expanded position of Minister for Arts, Heritage, Regional, Rural and Gaeltacht Affairs. She was appointed as Minister for Culture, Heritage and the Gaeltacht in the government of Leo Varadkar in July 2017.

On 30 November 2017, Humphreys was appointed as Minister for Business, Enterprise and Innovation. She succeeded Frances Fitzgerald, who had resigned on 28 November.

On 27 June 2020, Humphreys was appointed as Minister for Social Protection and Minister for Rural and Community Development by Taoiseach Micheál Martin. On 27 April 2021, she was assigned the addition position of Minister for Justice on a temporary basis during the maternity leave of Helen McEntee, serving until 1 November 2021. In November 2022, it was announced that she would be assigned to the position of Minister for Justice for a second time during the maternity leave of McEntee from December.

On 17 December 2022, she was re-appointed to the same positions following Leo Varadkar's appointment as Taoiseach, but her temporary position of Minister for Justice was given to Simon Harris.

References

External links

Heather Humphreys's page on the Fine Gael website

1963 births
Living people
Alumni of the University of Galway
Women government ministers of the Republic of Ireland
Fine Gael TDs
Irish Presbyterians
Local councillors in County Monaghan
Members of the 31st Dáil
Members of the 32nd Dáil
21st-century women Teachtaí Dála
Members of the 33rd Dáil
Ministers for Social Affairs (Ireland)
Ministers for Enterprise, Trade and Employment
Female justice ministers
Ministers for Justice (Ireland)